Gentlemen Prefer Blondes is a 1953 American musical comedy film based on the 1949 stage musical of the same name. It was directed by Howard Hawks and stars Jane Russell and Marilyn Monroe, with Charles Coburn, Elliott Reid, Tommy Noonan, George Winslow, Taylor Holmes and Norma Varden in supporting roles.

The film is filled with comedic situations and musical numbers, choreographed by Jack Cole, while the music was written by Hoagy Carmichael, Harold Adamson, Jule Styne and Leo Robin. The songs by Styne and Robin are from the Broadway show, while the songs by Carmichael and Adamson were written especially for the film. Despite the film's title, Monroe was paid her usual contract salary of $500 a week, while Russell, the better known actress at the time, earned $200,000.

While Russell's down-to-earth, sharp wit has been observed by most critics, it was Monroe's turn as the gold-digging blonde Lorelei Lee for which the film is often remembered. Monroe's rendition of the song "Diamonds Are a Girl's Best Friend" and her pink dress are considered iconic, and the performance has inspired homages by Madonna, Beyoncé, Geri Halliwell, Kylie Minogue, Nicole Kidman, Margot Robbie, Anna Nicole Smith, Christina Aguilera, Ariana Grande, Kylie Jenner, Rachel Bloom, Miss Piggy, Normani and Megan Thee Stallion.

Plot

Lorelei Lee (Marilyn Monroe) and Dorothy Shaw (Jane Russell) are American showgirls and best friends, although the two are very different. Lorelei thinks more of a man's financial wealth and likes men who can support her passion for diamonds, like her fiancé, Gus, who can provide all of her financial "needs". Dorothy prefers men who are good-looking and fit, and does not care about their wealth.

Lorelei plans to wed Gus in France, but the two are forbidden to travel together by Gus's strict father, Esmond Sr., who despises Lorelei. Lorelei decides to travel to France with or without Gus, and before she leaves he gives her a letter of credit to cover expenses upon her arrival, and promises to later meet her in France. However, he also warns her to behave, noting that his father will prohibit their marriage if rumors of misdeeds make their way to Esmond Sr. Unbeknownst to both of them, Esmond Sr. has hired a private detective, Ernie Malone, to spy on Lorelei.

During the Atlantic crossing, Malone immediately falls in love with Dorothy, but Dorothy has already been drawn to the members of the (all-male) Olympic team. Lorelei meets the rich and foolish Sir Francis "Piggy" Beekman, the owner of a diamond mine, and is attracted by his wealth; although Piggy is married, Lorelei naively returns his geriatric flirtations, which annoys his wife, Lady Beekman.

Lorelei invites Piggy to the cabin she shares with Dorothy, whereupon he recounts his travels to Africa. While Piggy demonstrates how a python squeezes a goat by hugging Lorelei, Malone spies on them through the window and takes pictures of the two, but is caught by Dorothy as he walks away nonchalantly. She tells Lorelei, who fears for her reputation. They come up with a scheme to intoxicate Malone and then search him to recover the incriminating film while he is unconscious. They find the film in his pants, and Lorelei promptly prints and hides the negatives. Revealing her success to Piggy, she persuades him to give her Lady Beekman's tiara as a thank you gift. However, Malone reveals he had planted a recording device in Lorelei's cabin, and has heard her discussion with Piggy about the pictures and the tiara. Malone implies that Lorelei is a golddigger and, when Dorothy scolds him for his actions, admits that he himself is a liar. However, Dorothy reveals to Lorelei she is falling for Malone, after which Lorelei chastises her for choosing a poor man when she could easily have a rich one.

The ship arrives in France, and Lorelei and Dorothy spend time shopping. However, the pair discover that Lorelei's letter of credit has been cancelled and are then kicked out of their hotel due to the information Malone shared with Esmond Sr.  The duo are forced to find work as showgirls in Paris, headlining a lavish revue.  When Gus shows up at their show, Lorelei rebuffs him, after which she performs Diamonds are a Girl's Best Friend, the musical number whose lyrics explain why and how women need to pursue men with money. Meanwhile, Lady Beekman has filed charges regarding her missing tiara, and Lorelei is arraigned for theft. Dorothy persuades Lorelei to return the tiara, but the pair discover it is missing from her jewelry box. Piggy tries to weasel out of his part in the affair when Malone catches him at the airport.

Dorothy stalls for time in court by pretending to be Lorelei, disguised in a blonde wig and mimicking her friend's breathy voice and mannerisms. When Malone appears in court and is about to unmask "Lorelei" as Dorothy, she reveals to Malone in covert language that she, Dorothy, loves him but would never forgive him if he were to do anything to hurt her best friend, Lorelei. Malone withdraws his comments, but then reveals Piggy has the tiara, exonerating Lorelei.

Back at the nightclub, Lorelei impresses Esmond Sr. with a speech on the subject of paternal money, and also makes an argument that if Esmond Sr. had a daughter instead of a son, he would want the best for her, to which he agrees and consents to his son's marriage to Lorelei. The film closes with a double wedding for Lorelei and Dorothy, who marry Gus and Malone, respectively.

Cast

Production
Although Hawks is credited as the sole director of the film, Russell and assistant choreographer Gwen Verdon contend that Monroe's iconic musical number, "Diamonds Are a Girl's Best Friend", was actually directed by choreographer Cole. Russell said, "Howard Hawks had nothing to do with the musical numbers. He was not even there." Hawks himself confirmed as much in an interview with author Joseph McBride: "I did a musical called Gentlemen Prefer Blondes, and I didn't do the production numbers. I didn't have any desire to." According to Monroe's last interview before her death, Russell was paid $200,000 for the film, while Monroe was paid her then usual $500-per-week salary.

Reception

Box office
The film earned $5.3 million at the box office worldwide, and was the seventh highest-grossing film of 1953, with $5.1 million grossed in North America, while Monroe's next feature, How to Marry a Millionaire, was the fourth-highest.

Critical reception
The film received positive reviews from critics. Monroe and Russell were both praised for their performances as Lorelei and Dorothy even among those critics who were not otherwise impressed by the film; the characters have entered pop culture. Bosley Crowther of The New York Times called Howard Hawks' direction "uncomfortably cloddish and slow" and found the gags for Russell "devoid of character or charm," but concluded, "And yet, there is that about Miss Russell and also about Miss Monroe that keeps you looking at them even when they have little or nothing to do." Variety wrote that Hawks "maintains a racy air that brings the musical off excellently at a pace that helps cloak the fact that it's rather lightweight, but sexy, stuff. However, not much more is needed when patrons can look at Russell-Monroe lines as displayed in slick costumes and Technicolor." Harrison's Reports wrote: "Both Jane Russell and Marilyn Monroe are nothing short of sensational in the leading roles. They not only act well, but the sexy manner in which they display their song, dance and pulchritude values just about sets the screen on fire and certainly is crowd-pleasing, judging by the thunderous applause at the preview after each of the well-staged musical numbers." John McCarten of The New Yorker wrote that the two leads "have a good deal of enthusiasm, and occasionally their exuberance offsets the tedium of one long series of variations on the sort of anatomical joke that used to amuse the customers of Minsky so inordinately." Britain's Monthly Film Bulletin praised Jane Russell for her "enjoyable Dorothy, full of gusto and good nature," but thought that the film had been compromised from the play "by the casting of Marilyn Monroe, by the abandonment of the 20s period and the incongruous up-to-date streamlining, by inflating some bright, witty songs into lavish production numbers, and by tamely ending the whole thing by letting two true loves conventionally come true. There is too, a lack of grasp in Howard Hawks' handling, which is scrappy and uninventive."

On review aggregation website Rotten Tomatoes, the film has an approval rating of 88% based on 88 reviews, with an average rating of 7.8/10. The site's critical consensus reads, "Anchored by Marilyn Monroe and Jane Russell's sparkling magnetism, Gentlemen Prefer Blondes is a delightfully entertaining 1950s musical." German film director Rainer Werner Fassbinder declared it one of the ten best films ever made.

Recent criticism has noted the film is groundbreaking for its depiction of female friendships and agency. Writing for Bust magazine, Samantha Mann wrote, “Throughout the entire film, the main characters Lorelei (Marilyn Monroe) and Dorothy (Jane Russell) display consistent loyalty to one another. There is no back-stabbing, shit-talking, or degrading one another to come out on top or gain the affection of a man. The women remain steadfast in their loyalty to one another, and tolerate no one speaking ill of the other. Providing support and comfort to one another takes priority over finding ways to secure their desired men.” Caroline Siede of The A.V. Club wrote the story may appear to be a “90-minute misogynistic punchline about the desperate schemes of two devious social-climbing showgirls, ditzy Lorelei Lee (Monroe) and witty man-eater Dorothy Shaw (Jane Russell). Thankfully, Gentlemen Prefer Blondes is quite the opposite. It’s a cheeky social satire about gender and class that doubles as a celebration of female ingenuity and solidarity, all glammed up in a ballgown and diamonds.”

Accolades
 
Monroe and Russell were accorded the honor of putting their hand and foot prints in cement in the forecourt of Grauman's Chinese Theatre, a spectacle that got a lot of publicity for both actresses and for the film.

See also 
 Gentlemen Marry Brunettes, a 1955 musical film based on But Gentlemen Marry Brunettes starring Russell and Jeanne Crain playing completely new characters

References

External links

 
 
 
 
 
 Blondes Prefer Gentlemen - (1961 US Navy training film)

1953 musical comedy films
1953 romantic comedy films
1950s English-language films
1950s satirical films
1950s sex comedy films
1953 films
20th Century Fox films
American musical comedy films
American romantic comedy films
American romantic musical films
American satirical films
American sex comedy films
1950s feminist films
1950s female buddy films
Films based on American novels
Films based on musicals
Films based on romance novels
Films directed by Howard Hawks
Films set on ships
Films scored by Lionel Newman
Films with screenplays by Charles Lederer
Films produced by Sol C. Siegel
1950s American films